The Bitter Tears of Petra von Kant is a 1972 West German romantic drama film written and directed by Rainer Werner Fassbinder, based on his own play. Featuring an all-female cast, the plot takes place entirely in the home of narcissistic protagonist Petra von Kant, and follows the changing dynamics in her relationships with other women. Petra's story is told in a theatre-esque fashion in four acts, each depicting her state of mind hinted visually by her clothes and hair. The film was entered into the 22nd Berlin International Film Festival.

Plot
Petra von Kant (Carstensen) is a prominent fashion designer based in Bremen. The film is almost totally restricted to her apartment's bedroom, decorated by a huge reproduction of Poussin's Midas and Bacchus (c.1630), which depicts naked and partially clothed men and women. The room also contains numerous life-size mannequins for her work, though only her assistant Marlene (Hermann) is shown using them.

Petra's marriages have ended in death or divorce. Her first husband Pierre was a great love, who died in a car accident while Petra was pregnant; the second began the same way, but ended in disgust. Petra lives with Marlene, another designer, whom she treats as a slave, and this relationship reveals Petra's sadistic, codependent tendencies.

First act 
Petra is shown being awoken by Marlene. She begins her day and gets dressed while her assistant attends to her. Petra makes a phone call to her mother, makes demands of Marlene (including slow-dancing), and dons a brown wig just before she receives a visitor.

Petra talks to Sidonie (Schaake), her cousin, about her male relationships. Meanwhile, Marlene does the work and acts as hostess. Karin Thimm (Schygulla), Sidonie's friend, joins the women. Karin, newly returned to Germany after residing in Sydney for five years, is a desirable but shallow 23-year-old woman. Petra, immediately attracted to Karin at this first meeting, suggests Karin become a model. Karin agrees to return the following day.

Second act 
Petra quickly falls madly in love with Karin. The next day, with Marlene showing clearer signs of frustration, but still typing, Petra, now wearing a larger and dark wig, offers to support Karin while she trains to be a model. Karin's husband has remained in Sydney, though Petra is only momentarily put off by this revelation. The women soon show their incompatibility. Petra had a happy childhood and came from a home where the good things in life were always stressed. Karin's father was a toolmaker, and she always felt neglected by her parents. Petra loved mathematics and algebra at school, but Karin could never understand algebra and the point of substituting letters for numbers. Petra has a daughter, whom she rarely sees, but reassures herself that her daughter is at the best possible boarding school.

Karin's parents are now both dead. She says people reject her when they find out about her history, but Petra now admits to a great affection for her, even stronger after having heard her family history. Petra orders Marlene to get a bottle of Sekt. Karin goes into more detail about her parents' death. Her father was laid off because of his age. In a drunken stupor, he killed Karin's mother and then hanged himself. Karin feels she has drifted in her life; her husband in Sydney treated her as a slave and offered no reprieve from her past, but Petra insists this is about to change. Marlene returns with the bottle of Sekt in a cooler, silently returns to her typing, and the other two women toast each other. Petra promises to make Karin a great model. Marlene, previously hidden by a curtain, stops typing and glares at Petra. While listening to a record, Petra says life is predestined, people are brutal and hard, and everyone is replaceable. Petra, discovering the expense of Karin's hotel, suggests she move in with her. Marlene resumes her typing, but after Karin agrees to move in with Petra, she is ordered to bring more Sekt. While Petra admits to being in love with Karin, Karin herself can only say she likes Petra. Six months or so pass.

Third act 
Petra, resplendent in a red wig, is getting dressed, while Karin is in bed reading a colour magazine. Petra cancels a flight to Madrid over the telephone, a habit which Karin thinks is pointless, and Petra orders Marlene to find her shoes. Karin thinks Marlene is strange, but Petra reassures her that Marlene loves her. Karin still cannot say she loves Petra. Karin's own capacity for cruelty emerges while the two drink gin and tonic together. The previous night, Karin had been out until 6am, and she admits to having slept with a Black American man. Petra is jealous and shouts at Marlene. Freddy, Karin's husband, telephones from Zurich. It emerges that they have been in contact by letter, that Karin is no longer planning on getting a divorce, and that she is rejoining her husband. Petra calls her a "rotten little whore", and Karin responds that being with Petra is less strenuous than working the streets. She asks Petra to book a flight to Frankfurt, where she is to meet her husband, and asks for 500DM from Petra, though Petra freely gives her twice that. Marlene drives Karin to the airport; Petra is now too drunk to drive.

Fourth act 
On Petra's birthday, the bedroom is almost empty. Petra, lying on the floor and now wearing a blond wig, is drinking heavily while assuming that Karin, her object of love and hate, will phone. Her daughter Gaby (Eva Mattes) arrives. Petra tells her little; Gaby admits to being in love with a young man, though so far it is unrequited. Sidonie appears with a birthday present: a doll with blond hair like Karin's. She admits to knowing Karin is in Bremen that day. Petra's mother Valerie (Gisela Fackeldey) arrives and is subjected to abuse. Petra accuses her of being a whore who never worked and lived off her husband. Petra tramples on a china tea service and smashes cups against the wall. She insists she is not crazy about Karin, but loves her. She claims Karin's little finger is worth all of them put together. Her mother, previously unaware of Karin, is shocked at the thought of her daughter being in love with another woman. Petra says that she hates Gaby and that she never wants to see Sidonie again, but Sidonie stays.

Final act 
Later that same night, Petra lies in bed without a wig, her natural auburn hair on display. Her mother tells her that Gaby cried herself to sleep. Petra is apologetic to her mother, and realizes she wanted to possess Karin rather than love her. Karin calls and Petra amicably declines seeing her before she leaves for Paris. Petra instead offers the chance that they will meet again in the future. Petra turns to Marlene after her mother has left, and apologizes for treating her badly. It will be different from now on, Petra promises, adding that she will share her life with Marlene. But Marlene, who has satisfied her personal masochistic desire in submitting to Petra, packs her meager belongings (including, notably, a pistol) in her small suitcase, and leaves, taking the doll with her.

Cast
 Margit Carstensen as Petra von Kant
 Irm Hermann as Marlene
 Hanna Schygulla as Karin Thimm
 Gisela Fackeldey as Valerie von Kant
 Eva Mattes as Gabriele (Gaby) von Kant
 Katrin Schaake as Sidonie von Grasenabb

Themes 
Solitude, love, and the claustrophobic feelings generated by emotional codependency are key themes explored by Fassbinder in The Bitter Tears of Petra von Kant. The solitary setting of Petra's bedroom maximizes the dramatic tension while serving as a mirror for her own entrapment.

Operatic adaptation

The text of the play, in its English translation by Denis Calandra, was employed by Gerald Barry as the libretto for his five-act opera, commissioned by RTÉ and English National Opera and premiered in Dublin and London in 2005. The opera is also available on CD featuring the RTÉ National Symphony Orchestra.

Legacy
The Bitter Tears of Petra von Kant and The Marriage of Maria Braun are considered landmarks of European cinema. The two films have secured Fassbinder an undisputed place as film artist and auteur.

The 2014 film Clouds of Sils Maria revolves around a remount of a play called Maloja Snake about an intergenerational lesbian relationship. Olivier Assayas (writer/director of Clouds of Sils Maria) acknowledged the link between The Bitter Tears of Petra von Kant and the fictional play Maloja Snake.

Peter Strickland has cited The Bitter Tears of Petra von Kant as a major influence on his 2015 film The Duke of Burgundy.

In 2022 French film director François Ozon released Peter von Kant, a reinterpretation of the film centred on a male film director.

See also
 Sadism and masochism in fiction

References

External links
 
 
 
The Bitter Tears of Petra von Kant: The Great Pretender an essay by Peter Matthews at the Criterion Collection

1972 films
1972 drama films
West German films
German drama films
German LGBT-related films
Lesbian-related films
1972 LGBT-related films
BDSM in films
German films based on plays
Films directed by Rainer Werner Fassbinder
Films produced by Michael Fengler
Films featuring an all-female cast
Films set in apartment buildings
Mannequins in films
Films about fashion designers
Films adapted into operas
1970s German-language films
1970s German films
Films based on works by Rainer Werner Fassbinder